Kiteni Airport  is an airport serving the town of Kiteni in the Cusco Region of Peru. The runway sits on a ledge above the Urubamba River with dropoffs on both sides. There is high terrain in all quadrants.

See also

Transport in Peru
List of airports in Peru

References

External links
OpenStreetMap - Kiteni
OurAirports - Kiteni
SkyVector - Kiteni
Kiteni Airport

Airports in Peru
Buildings and structures in Cusco Region